This article contains a list of Wikipedia articles about politicians in countries outside Korea who are of Korean origin.

Australia
 Elizabeth Lee – Leader of the Opposition in the Australian Capital Territory Legislative Assembly (2020–present)

Canada
 Raymond Cho – Minister of Seniors and Accessibility of Ontario 
 Stan Cho – Associate Minister of Transportation (2007–2012) of Ontario
 Sandy Lee – Member of the Legislative Assembly of the Northwest Territories
 Yonah Martin – Deputy Leader of the Opposition in the Senate
 Jane Shin – Member of the Legislative Assembly of British Columbia
 Nelly Shin – Member of Parliament in the House of Commons of Canada

China
 Jin Zhenji - Vice Governor of Jilin Province (2007-2011)
 Li Yongtai – Military officer and delegate to the National People's Congress
 Zhao Nanqi – Vice Chairperson of the Chinese People's Political Consultative Conference (1998-2003)
 Zhu Dehai – Governor of the Yanbian Korean Autonomous Prefecture (1952-1967)

France
 Cédric O – Secretary of State for the Digital Sector 
 Delphine O – Member of the National Assembly
 Fleur Pellerin – Minister of Culture and Communications (2014-2016)
 Jean-Vincent Placé – Member of the Regional Council of Île-de-France
 Joachim Son-Forget – Member of the National Assembly

Japan
 Shinkun Haku – Member of the House of Councillors
 Shigenori Tōgō – Minister for Foreign Affairs (1941-1942)

Kyrgyzstan
 Roman Shin – Deputy of the Jogorku Kenesh

New Zealand
 Melissa Lee – Member of the New Zealand Parliament

Russia
 Valery Kan - Member of the Legislative Assembly of Primorsky Krai

Ukraine
 Vitalii Kim - Governor of Mykolaiv Oblast (2020–present)
 Oleksandr Sin - Mayor of Zaporizhzhia (2010-2015)

United States

US Congress
 Andy Kim – Representative from New Jersey
 Jay Kim – Representative from California
 Marilyn Strickland – Representative from Washington
 Young Kim – Representative from California
 Michelle Steel - Representative from California

State and territory levels
 Francis Allen-Palenske – Member of the Nevada Assembly
 Jennifer Carnahan – Chair of the Minnesota Republican Party (2017-2021)
 David S. Chang – Chairman of the Hawaii Republican Party (2011-2014)
 Mark S. Chang – Member of the Maryland House of Delegates
 Jun Choi – Mayor of Edison, New Jersey (2006-2010)
 Steven Choi – Member of the California State Assembly
 Chris Chyung – Member of the Indiana House of Representatives
 Kimberly Fiorello – Member of the Connecticut House of Representatives
 Sharon Har – Member of the Hawaii House of Representatives
 Francesca Hong – Member of the Wisconsin State Assembly
 Hoon-Yung Hopgood – Member of the Michigan Senate and House of Representatives
 Justin Hwang – Chairman of the Oregon Republican Party
 Jacey Jetton – Member of the Texas House of Representatives
 Sukhee Kang – Mayor of Irvine, California (2008-2012)
 Mark Keam – Member of the Virginia House of Delegates
 Donna Mercado Kim – President of the Hawaii Senate (2012-2015)
 Harry Kim – Mayor of Hawaii County (2000-2008, 2016–2020)
 Patty Kim – Member of the Pennsylvania House of Representatives
 Ron Kim – Member of the New York State Assembly
 John Lim – Member of the Oregon House of Representatives
 Sylvia Luke – Lieutenant Governor of Hawaii (2022–present)
 David Moon – Member of the Maryland House of Delegates
 Kevin O'Toole – Member of the New Jersey Senate
 Daniel Pae – Member of the Oklahoma House of Representatives
 B. J. Pak – Member of the Georgia House of Representatives
 Stephen K. Yamashiro – Member of the New Jersey General Assembly
 Sam Park – Member of the Georgia House of Representatives
 Maria Robinson – Member of the Massachusetts House of Representatives
 Cliff Rosenberger – Speaker of the Ohio House of Representatives (2015-2018)
 Cindy Ryu – Member of the Washington House of Representatives
 Irene Shin – Member of the Virginia House of Delegates
 Paull Shin – Member of the Washington Senate and House of Representatives
 Alfred H. Song – Member of the California Senate and State Assembly
 B. J. Pak – Member of the Georgia House of Representatives

See also 
 List of heads of state and government of Indian origin
 List of foreign politicians of Chinese origin
 List of foreign politicians of Indian origin
 List of foreign politicians of Japanese origin
 List of foreign politicians of Vietnamese origin
 List of foreign politicians of Iranian origin

References 

Politicians of Korean descent
Lists of politicians